Ponchozero is a lake on the Umba River in Murmansk Oblast, Russia.  It is 10 km long and 3 km wide.

The lake is located 25 km north of the urban-type settlement of Umba on the White Sea, and about 10 km southeast of Lake Kanozero.

Ponchozero
Umba basin